Listed below are executive orders signed by Philippine President Bongbong Marcos. He signed a total of 14 Executive Orders to date.

Republic Acts, Executive Orders (including the Implementing Rules and Regulations (IRRs)), Proclamations, Administrative Orders (& IRRs), Memorandum Circulars, and Memorandum Orders are all compiled and published by the Official Gazette.

Executive orders

2022

2023

References

External link
 Official Gazette of the Republic of the Philippines

Presidency of Bongbong Marcos
Marcos, Bongbong